The Floris Grain Elevator, located off U.S. Route 64 in Floris, Oklahoma, was built in 1900 or 1926.

It handled over 350,000 bushels of wheat in its first year of operation.  It is on the National Register of Historic Places listings in Beaver County, Oklahoma; it was deemed "significant because it is the only extant structure associated with the grain industry and the Beaver, Meade and Englewood Railroad in Floris, Oklahoma. It also served an important function in the agriculture, commerce, and economy of Floris."

References

National Register of Historic Places in Beaver County, Oklahoma
Commercial buildings completed in 1900
Beaver County, Oklahoma
Grain elevators